Rene Daalder (born René Daalder 3 March 1944 in Texel, North Holland, died December 31, 2019, sometimes credited as Renee Daalder) was a Dutch writer and director.  He lived in Los Angeles. Originally a protégé of Russ Meyer, Daalder has worked with Jan de Bont, Frans Bromet, and Rem Koolhaas.

He is regarded as a pioneer of virtual reality and digital motion picture technologies.

Movies
His movies include the teenage horror classic Massacre at Central High (1976); the punk-rock musical Population: 1 (1986); Habitat (1997); and Hysteria (1997). He also directed the music video for Supertramp's "Brother Where You Bound". In October 2008, Population: 1, which features Tomata du Plenty of The Screamers, was released on DVD. He also wrote and directed a documentary on Bas Jan Ader entitled Here is Always Somewhere Else, which was released on DVD in November 2008.

Other projects
At the end of 2007, Rene Daalder launched SpaceCollective in collaboration with Folkert Gorter. The community-driven website, where information and ideas are being exchanged about the current state of our species, our planet and the universe, has over 2500 contributors. A growing number of universities, architecture and design schools are conducting projects on the website.

In 2008 Rene proposed a new genre of art called “Gravity Art” based on the idea of gravity as a medium.  Bas Jan Ader is seen as the founder of this genre, for the themes of his work of falling and letting go.

References

External links
 Rene Daalder's website
 Here is Always Somewhere Else official website
 
 Rene Daalder exhibition
 Population:1 official website

People from Texel
Dutch film directors
1944 births
2019 deaths